Stephen Hagan is an actor from Northern Ireland.

Stage career
Hagan's first big job after drama school was a part as Vito Barratini, a muse of the artist Michelangelo, in Antony Sher's play The Giant. Hagan was in the original cast of the West End and Broadway hit production End of the Rainbow, as well as in Cyrano de Bergerac opposite Joseph Fiennes at the Chichester Festival Theatre. Hagan also appeared in The York Relist at Riverside Studios, and The Real Thing at Salisbury Playhouse. He has also taken his turn in several productions for the Royal Shakespeare Company, including roles in Twelfth Night, The Tempest, The Comedy of Errors and Troilus and Cressida.

Television and film career
Hagan had a role in the Steven Seagal film Against The Dark. In 2007, Hagan appeared in the British drama Clapham Junction, before appearing in an episode of the BBC drama Mistresses in 2008. He also had a recurring role on the BBC drama The Cut and the ITV miniseries Injustice in 2011. He also made an appearance in the episode The Ballad of Midsomer County, of the ITV series Midsomer Murders, where he played Jay Templeton. Other roles have included Shooting for Socrates,  Best: His Mother's Son, Risen (as Bartholemew) with Joseph Fiennes, Zoo and A Royal Christmas with Jane Seymour.

Hagan has a recurring role in the Sky TV series Stan Lee's Lucky Man, which sees him play Rich, the brother of James Nesbitt in his role of DI Harry Clayton.

Personal life
From the County Antrim Town of Greenisland, Hagan was a student at Carrickfergus Grammar. Hagan contributed to amateur dramatics at Youth Lyric as a teenager, as well as White Lights in Whitehead. Prior to pursuing a career as an actor Hagan planned to study accountancy at Northumbria University and join his father's business. Hagan graduated from the London Academy of Music and Dramatic Art in 2007. Hagan in 2012 he became married to comedian and actress Wendy Wason with whom he has a son and two step-children. Hagan's grandparents are friends with the parents of his Lucky Man co-star James Nesbitt in Northern Ireland. The two had met ten years previous to the show when Hagan was a teenager and Nesbitt was in Northern Ireland filming Murphy's Law.  Hagan enjoys watching football and rugby and supports Arsenal FC and Ulster Rugby.

Filmography

References

External links

Living people
21st-century male actors from Northern Ireland
Year of birth missing (living people)
Male television actors from Northern Ireland
Male film actors from Northern Ireland
People from County Antrim